Brussels–Roubaix was a cycling race held between Brussels, Belgium and Roubaix, France on three occasions in 1901, 1905 and 1910.

Winners

References
CyclingArchives

Cycle races in France
Cycle races in Belgium
Recurring sporting events established in 1901
1901 establishments in France
1901 establishments in Belgium
Recurring sporting events disestablished in 1910
1910 disestablishments in France
1910 disestablishments in Belgium
Sport in Roubaix
Sport in Brussels
Defunct cycling races in France
Defunct cycling races in Belgium